Park Center Sofia, formerly City Center Sofia, is a shopping mall located in Sofia, Bulgaria, opened in the spring of 2006. It is south of the National Palace of Culture in the municipality of Triaditsa at the intersection of the Boulevards "Cherni vrah" and "Arsenalski", next to European Union Metro Station and diagonally opposed to the Hemus Hotel. 

There are more than 100 stores, several cafés, a pharmacy, beauty parlors, bank offices and  parking lots. There are also two hypermarkets presented in the mall: Technomarket and Billa. The cinema complex Cine Grand has six halls with a total capacity of 1,340 seats.

See also 
 List of malls in Sofia

External links
Official website

Shopping malls in Sofia
Buildings and structures completed in 2006
Shopping malls established in 2006